Xyletobius is a genus of beetles in the family Ptinidae.

List of species
 Xyletobius affinis Sharp, 1885
 Xyletobius aleuritis Perkins, 1910
 Xyletobius ashmeadi Perkins, 1910
 Xyletobius aurifer Perkins, 1910
 Xyletobius beddardi Perkins, 1910
 Xyletobius bidensicola Ford, 1954
 Xyletobius blackburni Perkins, 1910
 Xyletobius brunneri Perkins, 1910
 Xyletobius capucinus (Karsch, 1881)
 Xyletobius carpenteri Perkins, 1910
 Xyletobius chenopodii Ford, 1954
 Xyletobius chryseis Perkins, 1910
 Xyletobius collingei Perkins, 1910
 Xyletobius cyphus Perkins, 1910
 Xyletobius dollfusi Perkins, 1910
 Xyletobius durranti Perkins, 1910
 Xyletobius euceras Perkins, 1910
 Xyletobius euops Perkins, 1910
 Xyletobius euphorbiae Perkins, 1910
 Xyletobius flosculus Perkins, 1910
 Xyletobius forelii Perkins, 1910
 Xyletobius fraternus Perkins, 1910
 Xyletobius gossypii Ford, 1954
 Xyletobius grimshawi Perkins, 1910
 Xyletobius hawaiiensis Perkins, 1910
 Xyletobius insignis Blackburn, 1885
 Xyletobius lasiodes Perkins, 1910
 Xyletobius lineatus Sharp, 1885
 Xyletobius marmoratus Sharp, 1881
 Xyletobius megalops Perkins, 1910
 Xyletobius mesochlorus Perkins, 1910
 Xyletobius meyrickii Perkins, 1910
 Xyletobius mimus Perkins, 1910
 Xyletobius monas Perkins, 1910
 Xyletobius mundus Perkins, 1910
 Xyletobius nigrinus Sharp, 1881
 Xyletobius nudus Perkins, 1910
 Xyletobius nuptus Perkins, 1910
 Xyletobius pele Perkins, 1910
 Xyletobius praeceps Perkins, 1910
 Xyletobius proteus Perkins, 1910
 Xyletobius roridus Perkins, 1910
 Xyletobius scotti Perkins, 1910
 Xyletobius serricornis Blackburn and Sharp, 1885
 Xyletobius silvestrii Perkins, 1910
 Xyletobius sharpi Perkins, 1910
 Xyletobius silvestrii Perkins, 1910
 Xyletobius simoni Perkins, 1910
 Xyletobius speiseri Perkins, 1910
 Xyletobius stebbingi Perkins, 1910
 Xyletobius submimus Perkins, 1910
 Xyletobius suboculatus Perkins, 1910
 Xyletobius sulcatus Perkins, 1910
 Xyletobius sykesii Perkins, 1910
 Xyletobius walsinghamii Perkins, 1910

References

 
Ptinidae